This is a list of breeds of domestic sheep. Domestic sheep (Ovis aries) are partially derived from mouflon (Ovis gmelini) stock, and have diverged sufficiently to be considered a different species.

Domestic sheep breeds
Sorted alphabetically.

A

B

C

D

E

F

G

H

I

J

K

L

M

N

O

P

Q

R

S

T

U

V

W

X

Y

Z

Notes

See also

 List of cattle breeds
 List of domestic pig breeds
 List of goat breeds
 Lists of domestic animal breeds

References

Sources

External links
 Breeds of Livestock - Sheep Breeds Department of Animal Science - Oklahoma State University
 Sheep101
 Heritage Sheep Breeds

 List of
Sheep